Tracey Collins is an American educator and author who is the de facto first lady of New York City as the domestic partner of New York City Mayor Eric Adams.

Early life
Collins was born in New Orleans, Louisiana to a large family where she grew up with four sisters and many nieces and nephews.

Career
Collins is the senior youth development director for the New York City Department of Education and has served as an elementary school principal. In Adams' book Healthy at Last: A Plant-based Approach to Preventing and Reversing Diabetes, published in 2020, he said Collins "gets up at dawn to run the largest school system in the United States" and notes that she usually works "12 hours a day [and] never gets a break.” Collins ran a Brooklyn-based charity, Fully Persuaded, from its incorporation in 2007 until it was shut down in 2015.

She chaired Adams's Educational Taskforce when he was a state senator. Collins also collaborated with then-Senator Adams in 2010 on his Stop the Sag campaign, which placed billboards around parts of Brooklyn encouraging youth not to partake in pants sagging.

First lady of New York City 
During Adams's successful run for mayor of New York, Collins kept a low profile. She did not appear on the campaign trail with Adams or attend his victory parties. The New York Post has raised potential ethical concerns with the fact that Collins, who is an administrator in the New York Department of Education, would have her domestic partner also serving as her boss.

Collins lives in an apartment in Fort Lee, New Jersey, where she and Adams live during the weekends. During the 2021 New York City mayoral election, this apartment became a point of contention as rival candidates contended that Adams resided there on a regular basis.

References

1960s births
Living people
Year of birth uncertain
First ladies of New York City
Women in New York (state) politics
New York (state) Democrats
People from New Orleans
21st-century American women